William Petow, O.F.M. (or Peto, Peyto) ( –  April 1558 or 1559?) was an English Franciscan friar and, briefly, a cardinal.

Early life
Though his parentage was long unknown, it is now established that he was the son of Edward Peyto of Chesterton, Warwickshire, and Goditha, daughter of Sir Thomas Throckmorton of Coughton. He was educated under the guidance from the Grey Friars and took his degree of B. A. at the University of Oxford; but he was incorporated in Cambridge university, 1502–1503, and became M. A. there in 1505. He was elected fellow of Queens' College, Cambridge in 1506, and on 14 June 1510, was incorporated M. A. at Oxford.

Entering the Observant branch of the Franciscan Order, he became known for his holiness of life, and was appointed confessor to Henry VIII's daughter Mary. Later on he was elected Provincial of England and held that office when in 1532 he denounced the King's divorce in his presence; R. W. Chambers wrote that Peyto did not fall afoul of the statutes against prophesying evil to the king when he warned Henry of possible consequences in the future (having dogs lick his blood, as they had Ahab's, after death.), because he spoke conditionally of this happening if the king were to behave like Ahab.  He was imprisoned till the end of that year, when he went abroad and spent many years at Antwerp and elsewhere in the Low Countries, being active on behalf of all Catholic interests.

Exile
In 1539 Petow was included in the Act of Attainder passed against Cardinal Pole and his friends (31 Hen. VIII, c. 5), but he was in Italy at the time and remained there out of the king's reach. On 30 March 1543, Pope Paul III nominated him Bishop of Salisbury, though he could not then obtain possession of his diocese.  On Henry VIII's death in 1547, Petow's reputation was greatly enhanced, as reported by Gilbert Burnet in his History of the Reformation of the Church of England, when Henry's coffin, having sustained some damage from jolting along the rough roads to Windsor, was placed at the former Sion Abbey for a night, where some bodily fluids mixed with blood leaked through a cleft in the lead coffin onto the pavement; the next morning, when a workman came to repair the damage, a dog crept up and was observed licking up the fluid, in apparent fulfillment of Petow's prophecy. Nevertheless, Petow did not claim the bishopric even on the accession of the Roman Catholic Mary I in 1553, but resigned the see and retired to his old convent at Greenwich.
 
There he remained till Pope Paul IV, who had known him in Rome and highly esteemed him, decided to create him cardinal and papal legate in place of Pole. But as Petow was very old and his powers were failing, he declined both dignities. He was, however, created cardinal on 14 June 1557, though Queen Mary would not allow him to receive the hat, and the appointment was received with public derision. It was a tradition among the Franciscans that he was pelted with stones by a London mob, and so injured that he shortly afterwards died. Other accounts represent him as dying in France.

The date frequently assigned for his death (April, 1558) is incorrect, as on 31 October 1558, Queen Mary wrote to the pope that she had offered to reinstate him in the Bishopric of Salisbury on the death of Bishop Capon, but that he had declined because of age and infirmity.

References

Further reading
Charles Henry Cooper, Athenæ Cantabrigienses, I (Cambridge, 1858), giving new particulars as to his family and his university career
Anthony à Wood, Athenæ Oxonienses, ed. Bliss (London, 1813–20)
Anthony Parkinson, Collectanea Anglo-Minoritica (London, 1726)
Dodd, Charles, Church History (Brussels vere Wolverhampton, 1737–42)
William Maziere Brady, Episcopal Succession, I, II (Rome, 1877)
Francis Aidan Gasquet, Henry VIII and the English Monasteries (London, 1888)
James Gairdner in Dictionary of National Biography, citing state papers but otherwise an imperfect and defective account
Joseph Gillow, Bibliographical Dictionary of the English Catholics (London, 1885)
Mary Jean Stone, Mary the First (London, 1901)
Marie Halle, Life of Cardinal Pole (London, 1910)

 
  

 

16th-century English cardinals
English Franciscans
People from Stratford-on-Avon District
1550s deaths
Fellows of Queens' College, Cambridge
1483 births